Frederick III ( 1020 – 1033) was the Count of Bar and Duke of Upper Lorraine from the death of his father, Frederick II, in 1026 or 1027 to his own death. His mother was Matilda of Swabia, daughter of Herman II, Duke of Swabia.

His father had been co-duke since 1019 and his grandfather, Thierry I, continued to reign until his own death in 1027 or 1028.   His reign is completely obscure.  Even his regent is unknown.  He died young and his county of Bar passed to his sister Sophie while Lorraine was given to Gothelo I, Duke of Lower Lorraine.

House of Bar
Counts of Bar
Dukes of Upper Lorraine
Monarchs who died as children
Medieval child monarchs
1020s births
1033 deaths
Year of birth uncertain